Ang Tshering (or Ang Tsering) (1903 – May 22, 2002) was a sherpa known for his participation in the 1924 British Mount Everest expedition and the 1934 Nanga Parbat climbing disaster.

Tsering was born in Nepal in 1903, and worked as a sherpa from 1924 to 1973. He worked as a sherpa for the British expedition to Mount Everest. He was paid "Twelve annas, that's three-quarters of a rupee." During the Nanga Parbat expedition, he spent seven or nine days in the storm until he reached Camp One, and then was able to alert the Germans about the disaster. He worked as a sherpa for the 1965 Indian Everest Expedition. He also worked as a sherpa for Junko Tabei on her historic climb of Everest, on which she became the first woman to summit the mountain.

References 

Sherpa people
1904 births
Year of death missing